Godtfred Kirk Christiansen (8 July 1920 – 13 July 1995) was the managing director of The Lego Group from 1957 to 1973. He was the third son of company founder Ole Kirk Christiansen and took over as managing director in 1957, eventually becoming the sole owner. Godtfred is credited with playing a pivotal role in the development of the Lego brick design and patented it in 1958. He also created the Lego System in Play, the cornerstone of the Lego construction toy. Godtfred stepped down as Leader of the company in 1973. His son Kjeld Kirk Kristiansen became president in 1979.

Early life
Godtfred Kirk Christiansen was born on 8 July 1920 into a poor family and received limited formal education. He was the third son of five siblings. His father Ole Kirk Kristiansen owned the Billund Woodworking and Carpentry Shop, a small family business based in Billund, which produced wooden furniture and built property.

In 1924, at the age of four, Godtfred and his brother Karl Georg accidentally caused a fire and burned the woodworking shop to the ground. Godtfred later recalled, "My first contribution to the company – not that I'm proud of it – was when my brother Karl Georg and I lit the glue heater. Unfortunately some wood shavings caught fire – and the whole building burned to the ground."

During the 1930s, the business suffered from the impact of the Great Depression, and Godtfred's father focused on the production of household essentials, such as ironing boards, stepladders and small wooden toys. His father founded a new company in 1932 that would become known as Lego.

At the age of 12, Godtfred showed a particular interest in his father's business and helped out in the woodworking shop on the alternate days when he was not attending school. In 1937, at the age of 17, Godtfred had started to design wooden toys. From 1939 to 1940, while studying at Haslev Technical College on the Danish island of Zealand, Godtfred sent sketches for wooden toys to his father as ideas for new products.

In his early life, Godtfred learned the importance of maintaining quality in production from his father, in a story from his early life as documented by The Lego Group. One day, he had proudly declared to his father that he had saved the business money by applying two coats of varnish to a batch of wooden ducks instead of the usual three. Godtfred explained, "He looked at me: 'Godtfred, don’t you know that's wrong? I want you to drive up to the station and fetch those boxes back. Unpack them and give the ducks another coat of varnish. Then you'll repack them and take them back to the station. You're not going to bed until the work's done – and you're getting no help. You'll do it all on your own.'  There was no arguing with Dad. And it was a lesson for me about what quality meant."

Business career

Early career 
Godtfred took increasing responsibility in his father's business and in 1950, he became Junior Vice President of the company on his 30th birthday. Motivated by his ambition to better understand the business, he embarked on a sales trip in 1951, accompanied by his wife, Edith, which involved visiting all the customers in southern Jutland. This resulted in Godtfred winning several orders and also helped him to understand how products were displayed in shops. In 1952, he experienced a major disagreement with his father, who wanted to expand the factory. As a result, Godtfred resigned, but father and son later put aside their differences and he resumed his position.

Lego brick 

In 1946, the business made the first move towards the production of plastic toys with the purchase of a plastic injection moulding machine. This led to the introduction of a plastic product called the Automatic Binding Brick, which was in production by 1949. Ole and Godtfred were inspired by the design of a stackable cube with two rows of four studs designed by Hilary Fisher Page. The design was modified by the Christiansens and in 1953, the modified plastic bricks were given the name "Lego bricks". Unfortunately, initial sales were poor, as the bricks were not very sturdy and did not stick together very well.

In 1958, Godtfred played a pivotal role in the development of the modern Lego brick. On 28 January 1958, Godtfred sat in a meeting with his brother, Karl Georg, and Axel Thomson, the head of the sales office in Germany, and they discussed the complaints that they had received regarding the lack of sturdiness and clutch power of the bricks. After discussing several solutions, Godtfred sketched some ideas on paper and finally handed a design to Ove Nielsen, the head of the Lego moulding shop. The design was for a new brick with two inner clutch tubes. On his way back from the patent office, Godtfred then considered whether three inner tubes would work more effectively. He asked Ove Nielsen to create a new sample, which was sent to the patent office. This design featuring the three inner clutch tubes was finally patented on 28 January 1958 and became the iconic design for the modern Lego brick.

Lego system 
Godtfred is credited with defining the Lego System in Play, which became the cornerstone of the modern Lego construction toy. In 1954, he made a visit to a toy exhibition in Britain, where he met Troels Petersen, purchasing manager for the toy department of Magasin du Nord in Copenhagen. When Peterson commented that the toy industry had no system, Godtfred was inspired to invent a system that could be used in play and spent several months developing his idea. He defined six principles named the "Principles of Play" which included affordability, durability and suitability for boys and girls. Using these principles as a benchmark, he reviewed the company's portfolio of products and finally considered that the Lego brick conformed to all six principles and offered the most possibilities in terms of establishing a system of play.

Over the course of a year, Godtfred developed a single, integrated town theme that would allow children to create buildings and accessorise them. In 1955 Godtfred summarised the concept behind the system, "Our idea is to prepare the child for life, appealing to its imagination and developing the creative urge and joy of creation that are the driving force in every human being." The System of Play was launched in February 1955 at the Nuremberg Toy Fair. Despite early mixed reviews, it eventually achieved success in Denmark and later in Germany. The Lego System in Play eventually became the core focus of the business. Godtfred explained the system by stating that, "all elements fit together, can be used in multiple ways, can be built together. This means that bricks bought years ago will fit perfectly with bricks bought in the future."

In the following years, Godtfred continued to refine the system by defining its boundaries. He protected the integrity of the system by limiting the range of shapes and colours produced. The product range increased but it was strictly controlled by ensuring that all products consisted of these limited shapes and colours. This highly focused, expandable and integrated system eventually outlived its many competitors.

Ownership 
Godtfred was appointed managing director in 1957 and became the head of the company after his father died in the following year. On 4 February 1960, the company suffered a major setback when a fire burned the woodworking factory to the ground. The following day, Godtfred made the decision to focus on producing plastic bricks and discontinue the manufacturing of wooden toys. The Lego bricks were becoming more widely known throughout Western Europe, whereas the wooden toys were only sold in Denmark. Godtfred's brothers, Karl Georg and Gerhardt, did not agree with Godtfred's decision and decided to leave the company. Consequently, Godtfred bought their shares in the company and became the sole owner.

Legoland 
In the mid-1960s, a rising interest in model building resulted in an increasing number of visitors to the Lego factory. Visitors were given access to the factory and model exhibition, but eventually the growing number of visitors placed too much pressure on the company. Godtfred decided to solve the problem by exhibiting the models outdoors and asked Arnold Boutrup, a chief designer of a store in Copenhagen, to create a park. An area of land in Billund was transformed to create Miniland, a landscape of houses created with Lego bricks. The new park covered 14 acres and was built next to the Lego factory. Legoland Billund opened on 7 June 1968 and became a success, becoming one of the largest attractions in Denmark.

Late career 
In 1973, Godtfred stepped down as managing director to take the position of chairman of the Board of Directors of Lego System A/S. The role of managing director was assumed by Vagn Holck Andersen from 1973 to 1979, until Godtfred's son, Kjeld Kirk Kristiansen took over as CEO in 1979. Godtfred continued in his role as chairman of the Board of Directors until April 1993.

Family 
Godtfred was married to Edith Kirk Christiansen, with whom he had three children, Gunhild Kirk Johansen, Kjeld Kirk Kristiansen and Hanne Christiansen. Box art designs for Lego products from the 1950s show all three of their children playing with Lego bricks.

Death
Christiansen died on 13 July 1995 at the age of 75 at his home in Billund; his son Kjeld Kirk Kristiansen took over the company after his death.

References

1920 births
1995 deaths
20th-century Danish businesspeople
People from Billund Municipality
Lego people